Illapel is a Chilean city, which is the capital of the Choapa Province, Coquimbo Region. It lies along the Illapel River and marks the country's narrowest point along a parallel (94 km). It is located to the east of Los Vilos.

Administration
As a commune, Illapel is a third-level administrative division of Chile administered by a municipal council, headed by an alcalde who is directly elected every four years. The 2008–2012 alcalde was Denis Cortés Vargas (IND/JPM).

Within the electoral divisions of Chile, Illapel is represented in the Chamber of Deputies by Adriana Muñoz (PDC) and Luis Lemus (Ind.) as part of the 9th electoral district, (together with Combarbalá, Punitaqui, Monte Patria, Salamanca, Los Vilos, Canela). The commune is represented in the Senate by Evelyn Matthei Fornet (UDI) and Jorge Pizarro Soto (PDC) as part of the 4th senatorial constituency (Coquimbo Region).

Demographics
Of these, 21,826 (71.9%) lived in urban areas and 8,529 (28.1%) in rural areas. The population grew by 4.6% (1,348 persons) between the 1992 and 2002 censuses.

Earthquake of September 16, 2015

The earthquake caused physical damage, the loss of human lives, forced the evacuation of one million people from the coast (some sources mistakenly claimed a million people evacuated from Santiago), and a tsunami warning was issued for parts of South America, Hawaii, California and French Polynesia. Copper prices spiked in early trading, on fears of supply disruption.

See also
Las Chinchillas National Reserve

References

External links
  Municipality of Illapel
  Comercioillapel.com Tu Brujula del Valle del Choapa

Capitals of Chilean provinces
Populated places in Choapa Province
Communes of Chile
Populated places established in 1752
1750s establishments in the Captaincy General of Chile
1752 establishments in South America
1752 establishments in the Spanish Empire